is the 36th and final single by Japanese girl idol group Berryz Kobo, released in Japan on November 12, 2014.

The physical CD single debuted at 2nd place in the Japanese Oricon weekly singles chart. According to Oricon, in its first week it sold 77,285 copies, becoming the group's best-selling CD single.

According to Oricon, it was also the 76th best-selling single of the whole year 2014 in Japan.

Charts

Year-end charts

References 

2014 singles
Japanese-language songs
Berryz Kobo songs
Songs written by Tsunku
Song recordings produced by Tsunku
2014 songs
Piccolo Town singles
Japanese synth-pop songs